William Lumsden Dunlop  (20 February 1926 – 1994) was a Scottish footballer who played as an inside forward for Dunfermline Athletic in the Scottish Football League and for Exeter City, Bradford Park Avenue and Darlington in the English Football League. He was on the books of Bristol Rovers without appearing for them in the League. Dunlop also played for Scottish junior club Kilsyth Rangers and in English non-league football for Ilfracombe Town and Bideford.

Notes

References

1926 births
1994 deaths
Footballers from Airdrie, North Lanarkshire
Scottish footballers
Association football inside forwards
Kilsyth Rangers F.C. players
Dunfermline Athletic F.C. players
Exeter City F.C. players
Ilfracombe Town F.C. players
Bristol Rovers F.C. players
Bradford (Park Avenue) A.F.C. players
Darlington F.C. players
Bideford A.F.C. players
Scottish Junior Football Association players
Scottish Football League players
English Football League players